Vlastimil Kročil (born 10 May 1961 in Brno) is a Czech Roman Catholic clergyman. He is the current Bishop of Budweis.

Life
After graduating in 1986 he was rejected three times for the Theological Faculty in Litoměřice. He moved to Italy, where he studied at the Pontifical Lateran University (1988-1993) and the Pontifical Gregorian University (1993-1996). He was ordained priest on 16 July 1994 and named Bishop of Budweis on 19 March 2015 by Pope Francis.

References

External links
Bishop Vlastimil Kročil

People from Brno in health professions
Bishops of České Budějovice
Living people
1961 births
21st-century Roman Catholic bishops in the Czech Republic